Red Resistor is the third studio album by Von LMO, released in 1996 by Variant Records.

Track listing

Personnel 
Adapted from the Red Resistor liner notes.

Von LMO – lead vocals, electric guitar, illustrations
Musicians
Robert Lee Oliver II – bass guitar
David Tamura – electric guitar
Howard Valentine – drums

Production and additional personnel
Ian Bryan – recording
Peter Crowley – production, photography
Greg Griffith – recording
Ken Lee – mastering
Milton Morales – design, art direction

Release history

References

External links 
 Red Resistor at Bandcamp
 Red Resistor at Discogs (list of releases)

1996 albums
Von LMO albums